The Digest of Laws of the Russian Empire (Russian: Свод законов Российской империи, pre-1917 Russian: Сводъ законовъ Россійской имперіи) was the code of penal and civil law in the Russian Empire starting on January 1, 1835.

It was based on the Complete Collection of Laws of the Russian Empire (Russian: Полное собрание законов Российской империи, pre-1917 Russian: Полное собраніе законовъ Россійской имперіи), which is composed of 46 volumes.

External links 
 Digest of Laws of the Russian Empire (1857 edition, in Russian)
 
 

Civil codes
Law in the Russian Empire